Amurilla is a genus of moths in the family Lasiocampidae. The genus was erected by Per Olof Christopher Aurivillius in 1902.

References

Lasiocampidae
Moth genera